The Dover Quartet is an American string quartet. It was formed at the Curtis Institute of Music in 2008 and its members are graduates of both the Curtis Institute of Music and the Rice University Shepherd School of Music. Its name is taken from the piece Dover Beach by Samuel Barber. The quartet consists of violinists Joel Link and Bryan Lee, violist Julianne Lee, and cellist Camden Shaw. In 2020, the quartet was appointed to the faculty of the Curtis Institute of Music as ensemble-in-residence. Additionally, they hold residencies with the Kennedy Center, Bienen School of Music at Northwestern University, Artosphere, and the Amelia Island Chamber Music Festival.

The Dover Quartet has collaborated with artists such as Emanuel Ax, Inon Barnaton, Ray Chen, the Escher Quartet, Edgar Meyer, Anthony McGill, the late Peter Serkin, and Roomful of Teeth.

Discography 
The Dover Quartet has released three albums on Cedille Records: Tribute: Dover Quartet Plays Mozart, Voices of Defiance, and Beethoven Complete String Quartets, Volume 1 – The Opus 18 Quartets. Volumes 2 and 3 of the Beethoven Complete String Quartets are anticipated to be released in 2021 and 2022.

References 

American string quartets
Curtis Institute of Music alumni
Rice University alumni
Curtis Institute of Music faculty
Cedille Records artists